.nfo (also written .NFO or NFO, a contraction of "info", or "information") is a filename extension for text files that accompany warez scene releases of pirated software or media.

NFO files contain information about the release, such as the digital media title, authorship, year, or license information. This information is delivered for publishing through digital media to make it searchable on the web as well as within local catalogues and libraries.

Content 

NFO files usually contain release information about the media. The information may include authorship and license information. If the NFO file is for software, product installation notes can also be found.  NFO files are also often found in demoscene productions, where the respective groups include them for credits, contact details, and the software requirements.

Unlike README files, NFO files often contain elaborate ANSI art.

History 

NFO files were first introduced by "Fabulous Furlough" of the elite PC warez organization called The Humble Guys, or THG. The THG group would first upload their package to their world headquarters, "Candyland BBS" or later "The P.I.T.S. BBS", to establish distribution immediately.  Such organizations are also known as warez groups or crack groups. The first use came in 1990 on the THG release of the PC game Knights of Legend. This file was used in lieu of the more common README.TXT or README.1ST file names. The perpetuation of this file extension legacy was carried on by warez groups which followed after THG and is still in use to this day. Hence its strong presence on Usenet newsgroups that carry binaries and on P2P file trading networks.

The Humble Guys later became a demogroup, thus bringing the .nfo file tradition into the demoscene. More than forty thousand demoscene productions have an NFO file next to the program file.

Before Windows 95 was introduced, NFO files also sometimes used ANSI-escape sequences to generate animated ASCII art (ANSI art). These animations, however, required ANSI.SYS to be loaded by the DOS shell. If the user's computer wasn't already configured to load the ANSI.SYS driver, viewing ANSI art required reconfiguring and rebooting. Because of this, ANSI art was much less common, and getting ANSI art to display correctly on a Windows 95 PC often proved more difficult, leading to a decline of such art in NFO files.

The ASCII (American Standard Code for Information Interchange) code page 437 character set was originally designed by IBM for the earliest DOS PCs so many years ago.  Therefore, it was not destined to become standardized throughout the non-English world. Recently to aid internationalization, instead of using the old code page 437 extended ASCII characters, modern ASCII art uses the current de facto web standard ISO-8859-1/ISO-8859-15 or Unicode UTF-8 characters.

Usage of NFO files in publishing of warez 
The files have been explained as essentially being the press releases of the warez scene. They are commonly associated with warez groups who include them to declare credit of said release. NFO files were ubiquitous, and sometimes required, during the era of the BBS. The file was a stamp of authenticity, explicitly explaining what group released the software and described what modifications (or cracks) were applied if any.  Once a software was "packaged" with an NFO and then released, it was then officially owned by that group and no other group could ethically re-release that particular package.  A typical warez NFO file was elaborate and highly decorated, and usually included a large ASCII art logo along with software release and extended warez group information.  The most important information is which group, which cracker and which member actually tested and packaged. The designers of these NFO files, who worked closely or within the warez groups, frequently incorporated extended ASCII characters from the character set code page 437 in the file.

As of 2019, NFO files can still be found in many ZIP archives. In modern-day warez NFO files, a large ASCII art logo is frequently shown at the top, followed by textual information below.

Software 
The home theater software Kodi uses NFO files for its library. Plex Media Server uses NFO files for match movie library. Filebot app fetch artwork and create NFO files for TV shows or movies. NFO files are also used by media managers ViMediaManager, tinyMediaManager, Ember Media Manager, CouchPotato - a usenet and torrents client, MediaElch, TV show organiser Media Companion, digital media library manager Media Center Master. An NFO plug-in is also available for Opus, an open access repositories software.

NFO files are plain text files. The simplest method to view is using a text editor and selecting a monospace font and set "US Latin" or "extended ASCII". On Windows 95 using Microsoft Notepad the Terminal font set to 11pt usually produced a good rendering of ascii art on common CRTs of the time and could be set as the default viewer NFO files. However, web browsers use an incompatible alternative encoding scheme resulting in incorrect rendering of NFO files. Also, many modern text editors often use proportional fonts whereas the ASCII art included in both old and new NFO files is heavily dependent on the file being viewed with a fixed-width font. For this reason dedicated NFO viewers are available which are text editors with appropriate fonts (Terminus) and encoding settings, automatic window size and clickable hyperlinks. Additionally, online NFO viewers are also available to browse public NFO databases.

Microsoft Windows 

On Microsoft Windows, the NFO filename extension is associated with a Microsoft software tool called System Information (msinfo32.exe). System Information provides a general overview of a computer's system specifications as well as detailed information on the system's hardware components and information about the Windows environment. NFO files that are meant for System Information contain all of the information that System Information displays saved in an XML format.

See also 

 README
 FILE_ID.DIZ
 The iSONEWS
 .sfv - Simple file verification

References 

ASCII art
Warez
Filename extensions
Text file formats
Demoscene
Hacker culture